Karam Rajpal is an Indian television actor and a photographer. He is best known for playing the roles, such as  Maddy from Suvreen Guggal and Sameer Atwal/Iqbal from Nadaan Parinde Ghar Aaja on Life OK. He played the lead character Shivam Shrivastav in Mere Angne Mein, which was a household drama. 
 He also played the lead role in Zee TV's Manmohini.

Now, he is currently seen as Guddu in the television show Rang Jaun Tere Rang Mein on Dangal TV.

Acting career
He started his acting career by playing the role of Ayush Parekh, a lead role in the TV series Hamari Saass Leela which he left later on, due to some internal issues. He then joined the TV show Parichay where he played the role of Rohit Thakral, a recurring antagonist who was the brother of Richa Thakral. At the same time, he joined another TV show Kya Huaa Tera Vaada where he played the role of Madhav Chawla, a cameo who fakes his love for the protagonist's sister only for revenge. He then joined a youth TV show Suvreen Guggal – Topper of The Year where he played the role of Samar Raghuvanshi. Afterwards, he was a part of a TV show named Rakshak on Life OK where he played the role of police inspector Hemant Parulekar who wants to catch the vigilante Rakshak. The TV show Rakshak went largely unnoticed by the viewers. Beginning of 2014, he played the role of Sameer/Iqbal, the main lead in the TV show Nadaan Parindey opposite Gulki Joshi.

Lately, he played the role of Shivam Shrivastav in the TV show Mere Angne Mein on Star Plus, opposite Ekta Kaul and Richa Mukherjee for almost 2 years. The show was launched in June 2015 and went off-air in August 2017. In October 2017, he booked a negative role in Naamkarann as Vidyut.

Filmography

Television

Films

References

External links

Living people
Indian male television actors
Indian male soap opera actors
Year of birth missing (living people)
Male actors from Punjab, India